Combined word may refer to:
Portmanteau word, a word which fuses two or more function words
Compound (linguistics), a lexeme (less precisely, a word) that consists of more than one stem